The 2022–23 Oklahoma Sooners women's basketball team represented the University of Oklahoma in the 2022–23 NCAA Division I women's basketball season. The Sooners were led by second year head coach Jennie Baranczyk. The team played its home games at the Lloyd Noble Center in Norman, Oklahoma was a member of the Big 12 Conference.

Previous season

The Sooners finished the previous season 25–9, 12–6 in Big 12 play, to finish in fourth place. At the Big 12 Tournament Sooners beat number 5 seed Kansas at the quarterfinal 80–68. In the semifinal, they lost against the number 1 seed Baylor - whom they beat twice in the Big 12 regular season - 76–91. Oklahoma entered the NCAA tournament as a 4-seed where they faced off against 13-seed IUPUI. The Sooners would go on to defeat the Jaguars 78–72, advancing Oklahoma to the round of 32. In the second round they lost by the number 5 seeded Notre Dame 64–108, and finished they season. The season ending rankings the Sooners placed 22th (AP) and 21st (Coaches) place, marking the first time since 2017 that the Sooners have been ranked in the season ending polls.

Offseason

Departures

Additions

Recruits

2022 recruiting class

2023 Recruiting Class

|-
| colspan="7" style="padding-left:10px;" | Overall recruiting rankings:
|-
| colspan="7" style="font-size:85%; background:#F5F5F5;" | 

|}

Roster

Schedule

Source:

|-
!colspan=9 style=""| Exhibition

|-
!colspan=9 style=""| Non-conference regular season (10-1)

|-
!colspan=9 style=""| Big 12 regular season (14-4)

|-
!colspan=9 style=""| Big 12 Women's Tournament (1-1)

|-
!colspan=9 style=""| NCAA Women's Tournament (0-0)

References

2022-23
2022–23 Big 12 Conference women's basketball season
2022 in sports in Oklahoma
2023 in sports in Oklahoma
Oklahoma